Viper's grass can refer to:

Dinebra retroflexa
Scorzonera hispanica
Scorzonera humilis

See also
 Bidens campylotheca, viper beggarticks
 Echium, a flowering plant genus with some species known as viper's bugloss, particularly:
Echium plantagineum, purple viper's bugloss
 Echium vulgare
 Echium sabulicola, sand viper's gloss
 Maurandya barclayana, Mexican viper
 Pentalinon luteum, hammock viper's-tail